Philip Gemayel (born in 1740 in Bikfaya, Lebanon – died on April 12, 1796 in Bkerké, Lebanon) (or Filibus Al-Jumayyil, Philibos Gemaiel) was the 65th Maronite Patriarch of Antioch for a few months in 1795–1796.

Life

Philip Gemayel was born in Bikfaya, Lebanon about 1740. He was consecrated coadjutor bishop, titular of Listra, on December 1767 by Patriarch Joseph Estephan for the Maronite diocese of Cyprus ruled by his old uncle Elias Gemayel, to whom he succeeded as bishop in 1786. He, as his predecessors, used to reside in Lebanon.

Philip Gemayel was elected Patriarch on June 14, 1795. His election was opposed by some bishops; the ones nearer to the previous Patriarch Joseph Estephan died in 1793, i.e. Joseph Tyan, John Helou and Joseph Najm (or Nujaym). Philip Gemayel asked the Vatican for confirmation, writing a request with twelve propositions. But he died a few months later, on April 12, 1796, before getting his answer. Pope Pius VI, unaware of Gemayel's death, confirmed his election on June 27, 1796.

See also

List of Maronite Patriarchs
Maronite Church

Sources

 Pierre Dib, v. Maronite (Eglise), https://archive.org/stream/dictionnairedet10pt1vaca#page/n57/mode/2up, Tome Dixième, première partie, Paris 1928, col. 101. 
 Giuseppe Simone Assemani, https://archive.org/stream/serieschronologi00asseuoft#page/40/mode/2up, Roma 1881, p. 41.
 Konrad Eubel, Hierarchia Catholica Medii Aevi, https://archive.org/stream/hierarchiacathol06eubeuoft#page/87/mode/1up, p. 87.

Notes

External links
 http://www.gcatholic.org/dioceses/diocese/anti0.htm
 http://www.catholic-hierarchy.org/bishop/bgemay.html

18th-century people from the Ottoman Empire
1740 births
1796 deaths
Lebanese Eastern Catholic bishops
Lebanese Maronites
Maronite Patriarchs of Antioch
18th-century Eastern Catholic archbishops
People from Matn District
Eastern Catholic bishops in the Ottoman Empire